Mark S. Gold (born 1949) is an American physician, professor, author, and researcher on the effects of opioids, cocaine, tobacco, and other drugs as well as food on the brain and behavior. He is married to Janice Finn Gold. 

Gold is a former professor in the Department of Neuroscience, distinguished professor, and chairman of the Department of Psychiatry at the University of Florida College of Medicine, where he founded the Division of Addiction Medicine. His translational research has led to an understanding of the role of the nucleus locus coeruleus in addiction, the discovery of clonidine’s efficacy in opiate withdrawal, and the dopamine depletion hypothesis in understanding cocaine addiction.

Early life and career 
Raised in Teaneck, New Jersey, Gold was a 1967 graduate of Teaneck High School, where he was a Varsity Baseball player. Gold matriculated to Washington University in St. Louis where he was an Honors graduate and Phi Beta Kappa. In 1987, Gold was awarded a Distinguished Alumni Award from WUSTL where he majored in Psychology. 

He moved to the University of Florida in Gainesville where he worked from December of 1970 in the new Department of Neuroscience with Fred King, William Luttge, and Steve Zornetzer looking at overlaps in both the brain's sleep and memory systems.  

Gold earned his bachelor’s degree from Washington University in St. Louis and graduated from the University of Florida College of Medicine with his medical degree. He then completed a psychiatry residency and fellowship at Yale School of Medicine.

Gold began his career in research at University of Florida in 1970. He has authored over 1,000 published scientific articles, chapters, and abstracts.

He married Janice Finn in 1971, a Florida native who was born in Coral Gables.  

Gold was a distinguished professor of psychiatry, neuroscience, community health, and family medicine at UF. He became interim chairman and then chair of the UF Department of Psychiatry in 2008. During his tenure, he founded the Division of Addiction Medicine and its treatment program, the Florida Recovery Center. He also started laboratory studies in the UF McKnight Brain Institute on topics including second-hand tobacco smoke, sugar and drug self-administration, and fentanyl and opioid drug-induced anhedonia and reversal. From 2011-2014, Gold was the 17th University of Florida Distinguished Alumni Professor, where he had university-wide responsibilities and was honored by UF Dean Michael Good at the halftime at the UF Gators on Homecoming in 2011 on the 50 Yard Line of UF's Football.

After retiring as a full-time academic in 2014, Gold has continued teaching, research and writing as a University of Florida Emeritus Eminent Scholar, clinical professor at the University of Southern California, Tulane University, and the Washington University School of Medicine Departments of Psychiatry. Dr. Gold is an active member of the National Council at the Washington University School of Medicine’s Public Health Institute.

Research and writing career
Gold’s work has focused on developing scientific laboratory models for understanding drug, food, and other addictions that have led to new treatments. Gold was a lead researcher in the discovery of clonidine’s efficacy in opiate withdrawal and a rationale for opiate withdrawal symptomatology. Clonidine was the first non-opioid medication to reverse acute opioid withdrawal symptoms. He co-authored the dopamine depletion hypothesis (Patent #4/312,878) for cocaine addiction and anhedonia. His work helped lead to a new understanding of how cocaine is addicting and the physiology of cocaine craving and “crashing.”

With colleagues, Gold helped to define the importance of the route of cocaine administration in medicinal uses, safety and abuse potential. Gold and his Yale colleague Dr. Robert Byck studied cocaine levels and responses. He also described the phenomenon of smoking cocaine, mixing cocaine and opioids, and crack use in the United States. Gold started the first national drug helpline with Arnold Washton in 1983, and with NIDA's Director Dr. Bob Shuster, expanded access and breadth of drug hotline to cocaine and heroin in 1987.

Gold is co-editor of the 2012 textbook, Food and Addiction, published by Oxford Press, and has worked to evaluate the hypothesis that hedonistic overeating is a pathological attachment to food like any other addiction. Gold and Kelly Brownell co-chaired the Yale Conference on Food Addiction in 2007, one of the first conferences to discuss food, addiction, and hedonic overeating.

Gold's group had the first report in the medical literature on crack, addiction to second-hand tobacco, and cannabis smoke. Gold has also researched methamphetamine and, with NIDA’s Jean Lud Cadet M.D., described the drug’s long-lasting effects in a series of studies from rodents to human post-mortem; physician and health professionals who have become addicts and their outcomes after treatment; and internet and other behavioral addictions. Additional research interests include the role of exercise in neurodegeneration and recovery, treatment-resistant opioid use disorders, and reward deficiency syndrome. Most recently, Gold and collaborators have identified increasing adulteration in illicit drug supply chain and risks for the user and called for education and prevention in addition to current harm reduction and MAT initiatives in response to the overdose crisis.

He was the editor of the World Federation of Neurology's Journal of Neurological Sciences Special Issue on Addiction Medicine 2020 and also in 2022 as the Editor of the Journals special issue of Psychedelic & Interventional Psychiatry.

Honors and recognitions 
Gold was chief scientist of the "Afghanistan National Urban Drug Use Survey" for the US State Department and the Bureau of International Narcotics and Law Enforcement Affairs. The survey identified second- and third-hand opium exposure among children in Kabul and other urban Afghan areas.

Gold worked with Herbert D. Kleber, Deputy Director for Demand Reduction at the White House Office of National Drug Control Policy, to develop prevention, education and treatment programs for the use of medications in addiction treatment. Gold has also worked with DARE, Media Partnership for a Drug Free America, the Center on Addiction and Substance Abuse. Gold was a member of the Board of the Betty Ford Center Foundation in the area of drug use and youth and the DEA Museum, where he was a founding director.

Gold has received Phi Beta Kappa and Alpha Omega Alpha; Addiction Policy Forum Pillar of Excellence Award for research; the John P. McGovern Award for his contributions to public policy, treatment, research and addiction prevention; National Association Addiction Treatment and Policy Lifetime Achievement Award; and the Chinese National Academy of Sciences, International Scientist Award. At the University of Florida, Gold was named a Donald Dizney Eminent Scholar and University Distinguished Professor, with the annual White Coat Ceremony also named in his honor. He was given Inventor Awards from UF’s Office of Technology Transfer, the UF COM Wall of Fame, Exemplary Teaching and Minority Mentoring Awards from the UF College of Medicine, and Inventor Awards from UF’s Office of Technology Transfer. While a full-time U.F. Professor, Gold was awarded numerous patents including the development of systems to improve patient medication compliance and outcomes, new approaches and medications for overeating, and a detector to identify second hand tobacco smoke in the environment.

Gold was a founding director at Viewray, an MR-guided radiotherapy company specializing in oncology, and AxoGen, a company specializing in technologies for peripheral nerve recovery and repair. He continues to present epidemiological research on the opioid and emerging cocaine epidemics and behavioral addictions. Gold has written and lectured on responses to reduce overdose deaths, medication-assisted therapies, and opioid use disorders. He regularly lectures at medical schools; Grand Rounds; and national scientific meetings on opioids, cocaine, and the bench-to-bedside science in eating disorders, obesity, and addictions. Recently, he was editor of the World Federation of Neurology's Journal of Neurological Sciences Special Issue on Addiction Medicine 2020.

References 

American medical researchers
Living people
People from Teaneck, New Jersey
Teaneck High School alumni
Washington University in St. Louis alumni
University of Florida College of Medicine alumni
University of Southern California faculty
Yale University faculty
Washington University School of Medicine faculty
University of Florida faculty
1949 births
Tulane University faculty